Santa Clara station is a station on the Metrorail rapid transit system in the industrial district of the Allapattah neighborhood in Miami, Florida. This station is located near the intersection of Northwest 12th Avenue (State Road 933) and 20th Street. It opened to service December 17, 1984. Along with Brownsville station, Santa Clara is generally the lowest ridership station on the system.

Station layout
The station has two tracks served by an island platform. Access to the station is from the southwest corner of Northwest 21st Street and Northwest 12th Avenue.

Places of interest
Miami Dade College (Medical Center Campus)
University of Miami Life Science & Technology Park
Lindsey Hopkins Technical Education Center
Santa Clara Apartments, transit-oriented development

References

External links
MDT – Metrorail Stations
 21st Street entrance from Google Maps Street View

Allapattah
Green Line (Metrorail)
Orange Line (Metrorail)
Metrorail (Miami-Dade County) stations in Miami
Railway stations in the United States opened in 1984
1984 establishments in Florida